At the 1994 Goodwill Games, two different gymnastics disciplines were contested: artistic gymnastics and rhythmic gymnastics.

Artistic Gymnastics

Medalists

Rhythmic Gymnastics

Medalists

Details

Artistic Gymnastics

Men

Team All-Around

Individual All- Around

Floor

Pommel Horse

Rings

Vault

Parallel Bars

High Bar

Women

Team All-Around

Individual All-Around

Vault

Uneven Bars

Balance Beam

Floor

Mixed

Team All-Around

Rhythmic Gymnastics

Individual All-Around

Hoop

Ball

Clubs

Ribbon

References 

1994 in gymnastics
1994 Goodwill Games